Pedro Cunha (12 August 1980 – 28 April 2014) was a Portuguese actor who appeared in several TV series and soap operas in Portugal, England and Spain. He was found dead on 28 April 2014 after committing suicide.

Filmography
 Riscos (Portugal)
 Olhos de Água (Portugal)
 Olá Pai (Portugal)
 Dream Team (England)
 MIR (Spain)
 Génesis — en la mente del asesino (Spain)
 Circulo Rojo (Spain)
 Soy el Solitario
 Assalto ao Santa Maria
 O Cônsul de Bordéus

References

External links
Pedro Cunha official website
 

1980 births
2014 deaths
Portuguese male television actors
Male actors from Lisbon
Suicides by asphyxiation
Suicides in Portugal
20th-century Portuguese male actors
21st-century Portuguese male actors
2014 suicides